This article includes information about the child support policies of several countries.

Child support by country

Australia 
In Australia, the Child Support Agency calculates child support based on the income of each parent, a base amount is excluded, and the number of nights the child(ren) stays overnight with each parent. Parents can seek a review within 28 days of a change where income, assets or other factors lead to the formula not giving a result reflecting the particulars of a case.

Czech Republic 
In the Czech Republic, child supported is usually decided as part of child custody proceedings. The court may award child support as far as three years back before the case was started. The amount of child support depends on the particular custody arrangement, parents’ net income and whether they have other support obligations. A failure to pay child support in line with final judgement is a crime punishable by up to three years in prison.

Israel 

A little-known law in Israel allows for divorced Israeli nationals and foreign citizens to be detained in the country via a court-issued stay of exit order until they pay the full child support owed for their children until age 18 in advance. They can be jailed for up to 21 days for each missed monthly payment, and they are required to pay up to 100% or more of their income to settle the debt.

New Zealand 

In New Zealand, the Child Support division of Inland Revenue manages the application for, collection and redistribution of child support. Liable parents are assessed using a formula assessment scheme that determines payment liability based on the liable person's income and family circumstances. Departures from the formula are permitted under special circumstances, such as hardship, financial assets, special needs or through parental agreements. Payments are compulsory, with a minimum payment required, irrespective of ability to pay, though prisoners and long term hospital patients can apply for exemptions. Application for child support can be made by any person responsible for caring for a child but is only required if a parent receives welfare payments for themselves and their children. Children qualify for child support while they are aged under 18 years and are dependent on a caregiver.

Since July 2000, New Zealand and Australia have had a reciprocal agreement on child support. If the non-custodian parent lives in Australia, then Australia's Child Support Agency can collect child support and pursue debt collection on behalf of New Zealand's Inland Revenue Child Support, and vice versa.

Sweden 
In Sweden, a parent not living with their child should pay "underhållsbidrag", since parents are obliged to support for their children. The amount should be agreed on by the parents, with consideration taken for the economic need of the child and the economic situation of both parents. This may be in the form of a contract or simply an agreement. With joint custody where the child lives with each parents roughly half of the time no child support needs to be paid. The amount agreed on is adjusted for inflation each year (though it has been raised by 0% some years).

If the parent supposed to pay child support doesn't pay (or doesn't pay in time), the child may receive "underhållsstöd" from Försäkringskassan. This includes if the parent pays less than 1273 SEK per month and doesn't provide equivalent support some other way. The parent not living with the child should repay the amount paid as far as his/her income allows this, and may have to pay interest on the debt to Försäkringskassan.

The support belongs to the child, but is paid to the parent. It is paid until the child turns 18. For a child that is still in high school or equivalent, the support may be extended until the child turns 21, and after 18 it is given to the child directly.

For international cases, see Försäkringskassan's website and "Convention on the Recovery Abroad of Maintenance" in Swedish law, and relevant EU treaty (in Swedish).

United Kingdom 

In the UK, the Child Maintenance Service, part of the Department for Work and Pensions calculates the requisite contribution.

United States 

In United States, child support is the ongoing obligation for a periodic payment made directly or indirectly by an ("obligor" or paying parent) to an ("obligee" or receiving party) for the financial care and support of children of a relationship or marriage that has been terminated, or in some cases never existed.

Often, but not always, the obligor is a non-custodial parent. Often, but not always, the obligee is a custodial parent, caregiver or guardian, or the government.

In the U.S., there is no gender requirement to child support, for example, a father may pay a mother or a mother may pay a father. Depending on the jurisdiction, a non-custodial parent may pay child support to a custodial parent, or a custodial parent may pay child support to a non-custodial parent.

In addition, where there is joint custody, both parents are "custodial parents" and neither parent is a non-custodial parents, or in other words the child has two custodial parents. Thus, with joint custody, one custodial parent (as an obligor) may be required to pay the other custodial parent (as an obligee).

Child support enforcement in the United States at the Federal level is the responsibility of the Administration for Children and Families in the Department of Health and Human Services.  There is an overarching framework of federal legislation (title IV-D of the Social Security Act) and regulation within which the states must operate if they wish to receive federal funding. States may also receive additional financial "incentive" payments for establishing paternity, or establishing or modifying child support orders. Although the federal child support program in the United States traces its origins to a congressional concern for recouping  from absent parents some of the cash assistance paid to custodial parents, total U.S. child support collections in Federal fiscal year 2006 totaled $23.9 billion, $11 billion of which was paid to families who have never been recipients of public assistance.

Each state is responsible for developing a child support enforcement program that complies with federal requirements, including a Guidelines method of calculating child support. At a minimum, 45 C.F.R. 302.56 requires each state to establish and publish a Guideline that is presumptively (but rebuttably) correct, and Review the Guideline, at a minimum, every four (4) years. Most states have their own "Child Support Guidelines Worksheet" used by local courts and state Child Support Enforcement Offices to determine a "standard calculation" of child support. Courts may deviate from this standard calculation in particular cases.

The Uniform Interstate Family Support Act addresses the interaction of varying State legislation and regulations to ensure that only one state has the power to impose or modify child support at any one time, providing:
 Reciprocal recognition of orders between states
 Enforcement of child support across state lines
 Conflict of laws and orders awarded by different states.

Particular issues of conflict are further discussed in the Child support in the United States article regarding conflict of laws for the states of California, Connecticut, the District of Columbia and Maryland.

Major federal child support enforcement laws:

 1975: Social Security Act, Title IV, Section D
 1984: Child Support Amendments
 1988: Family Support Act
 1992: Child Support Recovery Act
 1993: Omnibus Budget Reconciliation Act
 1994: Full Faith and Credit Act
 1996: Personal Responsibility and Work Opportunities Reconciliation Act
 1998: Dead Beat Parents Punishment Act
 2000: Non-custodial Parent Federal Employee Health Insurance Requirement for Children

See also
Child custody
Legal custody
Physical custody
Child benefit

References